Local elections were held in the province of Laguna on May 10, 2010 as part of the 2010 general election. Voters selected candidates for all local positions: a municipal/city mayor, vice mayor and town councilors, as well as members of the Sangguniang Panlalawigan, the vice-governor, governor and representatives for the four districts of Laguna.

Candidates

Results

Partial Unofficial results from COMELEC 
Partial Unofficial Tally as of 2010-05-12 11:06:11 88.60% of Election Returns

Provincial & Congressional Elections 
Incumbent Teresita S. Lazaro is on her third consecutive term and was term-limited. Her son, Provincial Administrator Dennis Lazaro, ran in her place. He faced then-Pagsanjan Mayor E.R. Ejercito, former Governor Joey Lina, voluntarily-retiring vice governor Ramil Hernandez, and independent candidates Christine Amador and Randy Bautista.

Ramil Hernandez (Nacionalista) was the incumbent. Although eligible to run for his second consecutive term, he voluntarily retired to run for governor. His party nominated 1st District Board Member Dave Almarinez to run for vice governor. He faced then-Los Baños Mayor Caesar Perez, Celso Mercado, San Pablo City Councilor Eleanor Reyes, former Pagsanjan Mayor Abner Afuang, and Bernardita Cruz.

Congressional elections
Each of Laguna's four legislative districts elected a representative to the House of Representatives. The candidate with the highest number of votes wins the seat.

1st District
Danilo Fernandez was originally elected during the 2007 election, but the House Electoral Tribunal ruled that his residence in the district was not enough and was disqualified; no replacement was named. Fernandez is running again for the district's seat this year.

2nd District
Justin Marc Chipeco is the incumbent.

3rd District
Maria Evita Arago is the incumbent her opponents is incumbent board member in 3rd district Katherine Agapay and Former congressman in 3rd district and Former Mayor of San Pablo Florante Aquino

4th District
Edgar San Luis is the incumbent and is running unopposed.

Sangguniang Panlalawigan elections
All 4 Districts of Laguna elected Sangguniang Panlalawigan or provincial board members.

Summary

1st District
Cities: Biñan, Santa Rosa City
Municipality: San Pedro
Population (2007): 811,486
Parties are as stated in their certificate of candidacies.

|-
|colspan=5 bgcolor=black|

|-

2nd District
Cities: Calamba
Municipality: Bay, Cabuyao, Los Baños
Population (2007): 715,044
Parties are as stated in their certificate of candidacies.

|-bgcolor=black
|colspan=5|

3rd District
Cities: San Pablo City
Municipality: Alaminos, Calauan, Liliw. Nagcarlan, Rizal, Victoria
Population (2007): 470,972
Parties are as stated in their certificate of candidacies.

|-bgcolor=black
|colspan=5|

4th District
City: None
Municipalities: Cavinti, Famy, Kalayaan, Luisiana, Lumban, Mabitac, Magdalena, Majayjay, Paete, Pagsanjan, Pakil, Pangil, Pila, Santa Cruz, Santa Maria, Siniloan
Population (2007): 476,029
Parties are as stated in their certificate of candidacies.

|-bgcolor=black
|colspan=5|

Mayoralty Election
All municipalities of Laguna, Biñan, Calamba, San Pablo City, and Santa Rosa City will elect mayor and vice-mayor this election. The candidates for mayor and vice mayor with the highest number of votes wins the seat; they are voted separately, therefore, they may be of different parties when elected. Below is the list of mayoralty candidates of each city and municipalities per district.

1st District, Candidates for Mayor
Cities: Biñan, Santa Rosa City
Municipality: San Pedro

Biñan
Marlyn Alonte is the incumbent, she is running unopposed.

Santa Rosa City
2010 Santa Rosa Local Elections

San Pedro

<

2nd District, Candidates for MayorCities: CalambaMunicipality: Bay, Cabuyao, Los Baños

Calamba

Cabuyao

Los Baños

3rd District, Candidates for MayorCities: San Pablo CityMunicipality: Alaminos, Calauan, Liliw, Nagcarlan, Rizal, Victoria

San Pablo City

<

Alaminos

<

Calauan

Liliw

Nagcarlan

<

Rizal

<

Victoria

<

4th District, Candidates for MayorCity: NoneMunicipalities''': Cavinti, Famy, Kalayaan, Luisiana, Lumban, Mabitac, Magdalena, Majayjay, Paete, Pagsanjan, Pakil, Pangil, Pila, Santa Cruz, Santa Maria, Siniloan

Cavinti

<

Famy

<

Kalayaan

<

Lumban

<

Mabitac

<

Magdalena

<

Majayjay

<

Paete

<

Pagsanjan

<

Pakil

<

Pangil

<

Pila

<

Santa Cruz
Incumbent Mayor Ariel Magcalas seeks for reelection as Mayor of Santa Cruz against Former Congressman Benjamin Agarao and his predecessor, Former Mayor Domingo Panganiban

<

Santa Maria

<

Siniloan

<

References

2010 Philippine local elections
Elections in Laguna (province)
2010 elections in Calabarzon